Tom Everett (born October 21, 1948) is an American actor known for his performances in political films such as Air Force One and Thirteen Days.

Filmography

Film

TV

References

External links

1948 births
American male film actors
American male television actors
Living people
Male actors from Portland, Oregon
20th-century American male actors
21st-century American male actors